Meteor is a 1979 American science fiction disaster film directed by Ronald Neame, and starring Sean Connery and Natalie Wood. The film's premise, which follows a group of scientists struggling with Cold War politics after an asteroid is detected to be on a collision course with Earth, was inspired by a 1967 MIT report Project Icarus. The screenplay was written by Oscar winner Edmund H. North and Stanley Mann.

The international cast also includes Karl Malden, Brian Keith, Martin Landau, Trevor Howard, Joseph Campanella, Richard Dysart and Henry Fonda. The film was a box office flop and received negative reviews, but it was nonetheless nominated for an Academy Award for Best Sound.

Plot
After the asteroid Orpheus in the Asteroid Belt is hit by a comet, dozens of asteroid fragments are sent on a collision course towards Earth, along with a five-mile wide fragment which will cause an extinction-level event. While the United States government engages in political maneuvering, the smaller asteroid fragments preceding the main body wreak havoc on the planet, revealing the threat. The United States has a secret orbiting nuclear missile platform satellite named Hercules, which was designed by Dr. Paul Bradley. It was intended to defend Earth against a threat like Orpheus, but instead was commandeered by the U.S. Armed Forces to become an orbiting weapon now aimed at the Soviet Union. After many calculations, it is determined that the fourteen nuclear missiles on board Hercules are not enough to stop the asteroid.

The United States has known that the Soviet Union also has a similar weapons satellite called Peter the Great in orbit, with its sixteen nuclear warheads pointed down at the United States.  Needing the additional firepower to stop Orpheus, the President goes on national television and reveals the existence of Hercules, explaining it was created to meet the threat that Orpheus represents.  He also offers the Soviets a chance to save face by announcing they, too, had the same program and their own satellite weapon.  To coordinate the counter-effort between the two countries, Bradley requests a Soviet scientist named Dr. Alexei Dubov.

Bradley and Harry Sherwood of NASA meet at the control center for Hercules, located beneath 195 Broadway in Lower Manhattan. Major General Adlon is the commander of the facility. Dubov and his interpreter Tatiana Donskaya arrive, and Bradley gets to work on breaking the ice between them. Since Dubov cannot admit the existence of the Soviet device, he agrees to Bradley's proposal that they work on the "theoretical application" of how a "theoretical" Soviet space platform's weapons would be coordinated with the American platform.

Meanwhile, more meteorite fragments strike Earth (one inside Siberia), and the Soviets finally agree to join in the effort. Both satellites are coordinated, and turned towards the incoming large asteroid as smaller fragments continue to strike the planet, causing great damage, including a deadly avalanche in the Swiss Alps and a tsunami which devastates Hong Kong. With hours remaining prior to Orpheus' impact, as planned, Peter the Greats missiles are launched first because of its relative position to the asteroid, with Herculess missiles timed to be fired 40 minutes later.

Immediately prior to Herculess missiles being launched, a splinter fragment is discovered to be heading towards the command center in New York City.  If the center is destroyed, Hercules will not be able to launch. With seconds to spare, Hercules receives the signal to fire from the command center, and launches its missiles.  The splinter impacts the city, destroying the top half of the World Trade Center twin towers in a direct hit, and creating a large crater in Central Park. Several workers inside the control center are killed when the facility is partially destroyed by the collapse of the building above, and the survivors are forced to work their way out of the control center by going through the New York subway system, which becomes a trap due to water from the East River flooding the tunnels. Meanwhile, the two flights of missiles link up into three successively larger waves. The Hercules crew reaches a crowded subway station and waits while others try to dig them out.

Eventually, the missiles reach the meteoroid. The first wave of missiles strikes the rock, causing a small explosion, the second wave follows with a larger blast, and the third wave creates an enormous explosion. When the dust clears, the asteroid appears obliterated. In New York City, the radios broadcast the good news: Orpheus is no longer a danger to Earth. Just then, the subway station occupants are rescued.

Later, at an airport, Dubov, Tatiana, Bradley and others exchange goodbyes before Dubov and Tatiana depart on a plane for the Soviet Union.

Cast

Production
Theodore R. Parvin received the idea for the story from a Saturday Review article by Isaac Asimov about a meteor hitting a major city in the United States. Parvin hired Edmund H. North to write the screenplay, who took further inspiration from the Massachusetts Institute of Technology's Project Icarus. However, Ronald Neame and Sean Connery disliked both North's script and a rewrite by Steven Bach, and so hired Stanley Mann to completely re-write the screenplay. This led to a Writers Guild of America dispute over whether North should be credited as a co-writer.

During the writing of the North's first draft, Parvin secured financing and investment from the Shaw Brothers Studio, Warner Bros. Pictures, Nippon Herald Films, and American International Pictures. The film was an American International Pictures co-production with the Shaw Brothers Studio in British Hong Kong. $2.7 million of the budget came from AIP.

Neame cast Natalie Wood as Tatiana because she was the daughter of Russian immigrants, and she worked with George Rubinstein to perfect a Leningrad accent. Alec Guinness, Yul Brynner, Rod Steiger, Maximilian Schell, Peter Ustinov, Eli Wallach, Telly Savalas, Theodore Bikel, Richard Burton, and Orson Welles were each considered for the role of Dr. Dubov. Donald Pleasence was cast for the role, and filmed a few scenes as the character. However, he departed the production in order to work on the film Sgt. Pepper's Lonely Hearts Club Band. He was replaced by Brian Keith, who had been cast as General Adlon and was replaced in that role by Martin Landau.

Principal photography took place from October 31, 1977, to January 27, 1978, mainly at MGM Studios in Culver City, California, with some location filming in Washington, D.C., St. Moritz, Switzerland and Hong Kong. The release date was scheduled for June 15, 1979, but it was pushed back to October 19 due to special effects reshoots after special effects director Frank Van der Veer was fired.

Special effects
With most of the special effects budget already expended by Van de Veer (whose work was not usable, and subsequently discarded), William Cruise and Margot Anderson were hired to reshoot all of the special effects for what money remained. They were also fired, and replaced by Paul Kassler and Rob Balack, who were asked to complete the special effects, again, with what money remained in the budget (and just two months before the film's release). In order to complete the film on time, Kassler and Balack re-used footage from the 1978 disaster film Avalanche, filmed the Hong Kong "tidal wave" scene in an improvised water tank in Los Angeles using cardboard cutouts of buildings, and used 22-inch-long nuclear missile satellite miniatures that were far too small for effective filming.

Prop designer John Zabrucky, who had previously only worked in television, provided props for the film.

Music
The film was originally supposed to receive a score by John Williams, but he left the project.

Reception
Meteor was received poorly by critics. In her New York Times review, Janet Maslin called the film "standard disaster fare", adding that "the suspense is sludgy and the character development nil". 
Gene Siskel of the Chicago Tribune gave the film 1.5 stars out of 4 and wrote, "Let's face it, the bottom line on a disaster film is how special are its special effects. With 'Meteor,' the answer is not very. The big meteor in the picture, hurtling toward Earth at 30,000 miles an hour, looks like something I recently found at the bottom of my refrigerator — green bread." Variety called the acting "uniformly good" but the "principals mostly stand around waiting for the next calamity to happen ... What really matters to audiences for this kind of film, of course, is not the acting, but the visuals, and here, 'Meteor' gets good, but not great, grades." Charles Champlin of the Los Angeles Times wrote that "against its own odds, it is—for what it intends to be—uninspired but competent, efficient, commercial and entertaining, with some random moments that are very nice indeed." Judith Martin of The Washington Post called it "your standard 'My God — here it comes!' job, for those that like that sort of thing." John Pym of The Monthly Film Bulletin wrote, "As effects go, and effects rather than surprises (or any real plotline) are what the producers have banked on, Meteor looks decidedly old-fashioned and second-hand." TV Guide writes- "An $18 million, star-studded disaster film, which in itself is a major disaster."

On Rotten Tomatoes the film has a rating of 5% based on 19 reviews, with the site's consensus being “Meteor is a flimsy flick with too much boring dialogue and not enough destruction. At least the pinball game is decent.”

Marvel Comics published a comic book adaptation of the film by writer Ralph Macchio and artists Gene Colan and Tom Palmer in Marvel Super Special #14.

Samuel Z. Arkoff called Meteor the most difficult production ever undertaken by American International Pictures due to the high production, special effects, and marketing costs. After the film flopped, the studio was forced to enter negotiations for a buyout from Filmways.

Accolades
At the 52nd Academy Awards in 1980, the film was nominated for the Academy Award for Best Sound (William McCaughey, Aaron Rochin, Michael J. Kohut and Jack Solomon). It lost to Apocalypse Now.

Scientific basis
A voiceover at the end of the film mentions "Project Icarus", a report on the concept to use missiles to deflect an earthbound asteroid.  The original Project Icarus was a student project at M.I.T. in a systems engineering class led by Professor Paul Sandorff in the Spring 1967. It examined methodologies that could deflect an Apollo asteroid named 1566 Icarus if it was found to be on a collision course with Earth. Time published an article about the research in June 1967. The results of the student reports were published in a book the following year.

See also 
 Asteroid impact avoidance
 Armageddon (1998) 
 Deep Impact (1998).
 Meteor (2009), a 4-hour 2-part miniseries.
 Don't Look Up (2021).

References

External links 
 
 
 

1979 films
1970s science fiction action films
1970s disaster films
American disaster films
American International Pictures films
American science fiction action films
American space adventure films
Fiction about the Apollo asteroids
Cold War films
Shaw Brothers Studio films
1970s English-language films
Films about nuclear war and weapons
Films adapted into comics
Films directed by Ronald Neame
Films set in Hong Kong
Films set in New York City
Films set in Switzerland
Films about impact events
Fiction about meteoroids
Films scored by Laurence Rosenthal
Films with screenplays by Stanley Mann
Comets in film
Avalanches in film
Films shot in Switzerland
Films shot in Washington, D.C.
Films shot in Hong Kong
Films shot in Los Angeles County, California
1970s American films